Olive's Step is the 6th album by Japanese guitarist Kazumi Watanabe. The album was released on LP by Better Days label of Nippon Columbia in 1977.

Track listing

Personnel 
 Kazumi Watanabe - Electric guitar (A1-A4, B1-3), Acoustic guitar (A1, A3), Clap Hand(B3)
 Ryuichi Sakamoto - Electric piano (A1-A4), Clavinet (A1), Piano (A2), ARP Odyssey (A2, A4), Yamaha Polyphonic Synthesizer (A2-A4), Solina (A4)
 Hiroshi Matsumoto - Electric piano (B1-B3), ARP Odyssey (B1), Piano (B2-B3), Solina (B2), Clap Hand(B3)
 Tsugutoshi Goto - Electric bass (A1-A4)
 Nobuyoshi Ino - Electric bass (B1-B3), Clap Hand(B3)
 Hiro Tsunoda - Drums (A1-A4)
 Arihide Kurata - Drums (B1-B3), Clap Hand(B3)
 Tatsuji Yokoyama - Percussion (B1-B3)

Production 
 Producer - Kazumi Watanabe
 Assistant Producers & Management Office - Zen Production Inc.
 Recording Director - Tomohiro Saito
 Mixing & Remixing Engineer – Kaoru Iida
 Cover Design – Sign-Satoshi Saitoh, Mobuo Izumi
 Art stuff - Hideo Nakata (Mok)
 Cover Photo – Tadayuki Naitoh
 Liner notes - Masamichi Okazaki
 Liner notes - Eiichi Yoshimura (COCB-54209)

Release history

External links

References 

1977 albums
Kazumi Watanabe albums